

The Morrow Plots is an experimental agricultural field at the University of Illinois Urbana-Champaign. Named for Professor George E. Morrow, it is the oldest such field in the United States and the second oldest in the world. It was established in 1876 as the first experimental corn field at an American college and continues to be used today, although with three plots of much reduced size, instead of the original ten half-acre lots.  The site was designated a National Historic Landmark on May 23, 1968.  The fields are managed by the College of Agricultural, Consumer, and Environmental Sciences.

Description
The Morrow Plots occupy a central position on the campus of the University of Illinois Urbana-Champaign (UIUC), between the Main Quad and the South Quad.  They are bounded on the south by West Gregory Drive, the north by the Observatory, the east by the Woese Institute for Genomic Biology, and the west by the Undergraduate Library.  The plots currently consist of six small fields, each one-tenth of an acre in size.  The two northernmost plots have been continuously planted in maize (corn) since 1876.  The middle plots were originally planted in a rotation of corn and oats, with the oats replaced by soybeans in 1968.  The southern plots were originally planted in a rotation of three years corn followed by three years meadow; this was replaced in 1901 by a rotation of corn, oats, and clover, and in 1953 by corn, oats, and alfalfa.

It is popularly believed that the University constructed its Undergraduate Library to the west of the Plots with three stories underground, so that the library would not block the sun from the Morrow Plots. However, the University master plan at the time called for a large open plaza on that end of campus, which was an equally important reason the library was built underground.

History
The Morrow Plots were begun in 1876 by Professor Manly Miles, who established three half-acre fields with different crop schemes.  These were expanded to ten plots in 1879 by George E. Morrow.  At first, record keeping was not of the highest caliber, but by the turn of the 20th century it was clear that crop rotation was a useful component in preventing the depletion of soil quality.  In the early 20th century, the number of plots were reduced, and their size was also reduced, in order to facilitate expansion of the university facilities.  The northernmost plots are the only ones that date to Miles' 1876 establishment; his other plots are now occupied by the University of Illinois Observatory.

The results of the experiments which were carried out at the Morrow Plots showed that "soil quality is a vital component of agricultural productivity", and that the "use of science and technology ... increased crop productivity over four-fold."

Gallery

See also
 Long-term experiment
 List of National Historic Landmarks in Illinois

References

External links

 The Morrow Plots by the Department of Crop Sciences at the University of Illinois Urbana-Champaign
 

National Historic Landmarks in Illinois
University of Illinois Urbana-Champaign
National Register of Historic Places in Champaign County, Illinois
Farms on the National Register of Historic Places in Illinois